Babarashani (also Romanized as Bābārashānī, Bābā Rashānī, Bābā Reshānī, and Bābā Rīshānī; also known as Baba Shani) is a city and capital of Chang Almas District, in Bijar County, Kurdistan Province, Iran. At the 2006 census, its population was 481, in 128 families. The village is populated by Kurds.

References

Towns and villages in Bijar County
Cities in Kurdistan Province
Kurdish settlements in Kurdistan Province